Christopher Lee Meng Soon (born 23 July 1971) is a Malaysian actor, host and singer based in Singapore.

Early life
Lee studied up to form 5 in Sekolah Menengah Seri Kota, Air Leleh, Malacca, Malaysia. He was an active student in school, serving as a prefect and representing his school in rugby competitions. He has an older sister and two younger brothers, the youngest being Frederick Lee Meng Chong, who is also an actor and model in Malaysia.

Career
Lee joined TCS on a contract in 1995 after emerging as 1st runner-up in the male category of the Star Search programme in 1995. He worked as a factory worker, salesman and part-time model before joining star search in 1995. Lee first started acting in Chinese-language television dramas produced by Channel 8.

Lee rose to prominence in his career after winning the Best Actor award at the Star Awards 1997 for his role as a hanjian in the television drama The Price of Peace, set in Japanese-occupied Singapore during World War II. In 1998, he starred as Yang Guo in The Return of the Condor Heroes, an adaptation of Louis Cha's novel of the same title. He was voted in as Taiwan's Most Popular MediaCorp Male Artiste at the Star Awards 1998 for his performance. Since then, Lee has acted in many television series jointly produced by Singapore and other countries in the Asia-Pacific region, co-starring with actors from Hong Kong and Taiwan, such as Nadia Chan, Vincent Chiao, Jimmy Lin and Jordan Chan.

Apart from acting, Lee also recorded the theme songs of MediaCorp's television dramas. He released his first solo album in 1999 and another one in 2002.

At the 2010 Star Awards, Lee was awarded the coveted All-Time Favourite Artiste Award after winning the Top 10 Most Popular Male Artistes award from 1997–1998, 2000, 2002-2009 respectively with long-time colleague Mark Lee He became the first non-Singaporean artiste to win the award. More recently, Lee has also ventured into hosting and has hosted several travel and food programmes. He was nominated for the Best Info-Ed Show Host award at the Star Awards 2012.

On 9 November 2021, Lee launched a golf clothing brand, eponymously named LMS, the initials of his Chinese name in pinyin.

Personal life
After an eight-year courtship, Lee married Fann Wong, his co-star in several television series, on 16 May 2009. The wedding ceremony was held at Shangri-La Hotel Singapore, with many of Lee's colleagues from the entertainment industry attending their wedding. The couple have a son Zed, who was born on 9 August 2014.

Legal issues 
On 8 October 2006, Lee was involved in a hit-and-run road accident. He had allegedly knocked down a motorcyclist due to suspected drunk driving, causing the motorcyclist and his pillion rider to suffer superficial injuries on their faces and legs. He failed the breathalyser test and was more than twice the legal limit. He was arrested and released later on bail.

Despite the incident, Lee managed to win a position among the Top 10 Male Artistes in the Star Awards 2006. In his acceptance speech, Lee said in Mandarin that he had been feeling terrible over the incident during the previous two months, and that he would be responsible for what he did. Speaking to reporters later, he mentioned that he had been unable to sleep at times, adding that he was very grateful to his fans for their support.

On 10 May 2007, Lee was fined S$4,500 and disqualified from driving for three years on charges of drunk driving and other traffic offences, as well as being sentenced to a prison term of four weeks after he admitted to drink driving, inconsiderate driving, failing to render aid to the injured motorcyclist and his injured pillion rider and removing his car from the scene without police permission.  Lee appealed against his jail sentence but withdrew his appeal later on 28 May. He began serving his sentence at Queenstown Remand Prison on the same day. On 15 June, the prosecution succeeded in appealing against Lee's four-week jail sentence and the court decided to overturn an earlier sentence of a S$3,000 fine for his drunk driving offence. Lee was sentenced to an additional two weeks in prison, making his total prison term six weeks long. On 21 June, the prosecution dropped the last of five charges against Lee for failing to stop after an accident, letting him off with a stern warning instead. Lee was released on 25 June, after receiving a reduction in his prison sentence due to good behavior.

Due to his conviction, Lee was dropped from playing the lead role in the 2007 Channel 8 television series Metamorphosis. He was replaced by actor Thomas Ong.

On 12 July 2007, the Immigration and Checkpoints Authority (ICA) completed its review on Lee's case and decided to allow him to retain his Singapore Permanent Resident status. However, Lee will be under close observation and the ICA would revoke its decision if Lee violates the law again. After the conviction, he made his comeback in the 2008 television drama Rhythm of Life.

Filmography

Television series

Film

Discography

Albums
 Christopher Lee Story (1999)
 Love, No Boundaries (2002)

Singles

Compilation album

Awards and nominations

References

External links

 
Mediacorp Singapore
Christopher Lee at hkmdb.com

1971 births
Living people
Singaporean Buddhists
Malaysian people of Chinese descent
Malaysian male models
People from Malacca
Singaporean male television actors
Singaporean male film actors
20th-century Singaporean male singers
20th-century Singaporean male actors
21st-century Singaporean male actors
Mediacorp
Malaysian people of Teochew descent
21st-century Singaporean male singers
Malaysian expatriates in Taiwan
Malaysian emigrants to Singapore